The Green Dome is a green-coloured dome built above the tombs of the Islamic prophet Muhammad and the early Rashidun Caliphs Abu Bakr and Umar, which used to be Aisha's chamber. The dome is located in the southeast corner of Al-Masjid al-Nabawi (Mosque of the Prophet) in Medina, Saudi Arabia. Millions visit it every year, since it is a tradition to visit the mosque after or before the pilgrimage to Mecca.

The structure dates back to 1279 C.E., when an unpainted wooden cupola was built over the tomb. It was later rebuilt and painted using different colours twice in the late 15th century and once in 1817. The dome was first painted green in 1837, and hence became known as the "Green Dome".

History

Built in 1279 C.E. or 678 A.H., during the reign of Mamluk Sultan Al Mansur Qalawun, the original structure was made out of wood and was colourless, painted white and blue in later restorations. After a serious fire struck the Mosque in 1481, the mosque and dome had been burnt and a restoration project was initiated by Sultan Qaitbay who had most of the wooden base replaced by a brick structure in order to prevent the collapse of the dome in the future, and used plates of lead to cover the new wooden dome. The building, including the Tomb of the Prophet, was extensively renewed through Qaitbay's patronage. The current dome was added in 1818 by the Ottoman Sultan Mahmud II. The dome was first painted green in 1837.

When Saud bin Abdul-Aziz took Medina in 1805, his followers, the Wahhabis, demolished nearly every tomb dome in Medina based on their belief that the veneration of tombs and places claimed to possess supernatural powers is an offense against tawhid. The tomb was stripped of its gold and jewel ornaments, but the dome was preserved either because of an unsuccessful attempt to demolish its hardened structure, or because some time ago Ibn Abd al-Wahhab wrote that he did not wish to see the dome destroyed despite his aversion to people praying at the tomb. Similar events took place in 1925 when the Saudi militias retook—and this time managed to keep—the city. Most of the famous Muslim scholars of the Wahhabi Sect support the decision made by Saudi authorities not to allow veneration of the tomb as it was built much later after the death of Muhammad and considered it as an "innovation".

Tomb of Muhammad and early caliphs

Muhammad's grave lies within the confines of what used to be his and his wife Aisha's house, the Hujra. During his lifetime, it adjoined the mosque. The first and second Rashidun Caliphs, Abu Bakr and Umar, are buried next to Muhammad. Umar was given a spot next to Abu Bakr by Aisha, which had originally been intended for her. The mosque was expanded during the reign of Umayyad Caliph al-Walid I to include their tombs. Muhammad's grave is an important reason for the particular high sanctity of the mosque, as the Dome of the Prophet marks the location of the tomb. Muhammad's grave itself cannot be seen, as the area is cordoned off by a gold mesh and black curtains.

A fourth vacant spot is believed to be reserved for Isa ibn Maryam (Jesus) in the event of his return.

The graves and what remains of Aisha's house are enclosed by a 5-sided wall, without doors or windows, built by caliph Umar II. The irregular pentagon shape was chosen deliberately, to make it look different from 4-sided Kaaba, so to discourage people from performing tawaf around it. This enclosure was not entered since Qaitbay's reconstruction of 1481. Only this wall, draped in green cloth, can be seen through the grills of the outer wall, which was built several centuries later and is currently accessible to the public.

Panorama

Gallery

See also

 Bayt al-Mawlid, the house where Muhammad is believed to have been born
 Burial places of founders of world religions
 Destruction of early Islamic heritage sites in Saudi Arabia

References

Islamic buildings
Mosques in Medina
Mosque buildings with domes
Al-Masjid an-Nabawi
Buildings and structures completed in the 13th century